The MV Nankai Maru was an  freighter built by Mitsubishi Shipbuilding & Engineering Company Ltd, Nagasaki, Japan, in 1933 for Osaka Shosen Kaisha.

She was requisitioned by the Imperial Japanese Navy as a transport in late 1941. She participated in the invasion fleets at Midway, Milne Bay (where she was damaged by a bomb), Guadalcanal (where she was also damaged by a bomb). She was struck by a dud torpedo from USS Kingfish on 8 December 1942 near Okinotorishima. On 25 December 1943, she was damaged by a torpedo from USS Seadragon near Cape St. George, New Ireland and later collided with the destroyer Uzuki. She was sunk by a torpedo from USS Sealion while travelling from Singapore on 12 September 1944 in the South China Sea east of Hainan Island at 18°42'N, 114°30'E.

Citations

External links
Nankai Maru

1932 ships
Auxiliary ships of the Imperial Japanese Navy
Ships sunk by American submarines